Stepneth is an unusual surname. Notable people with the surname include:

Alban Stepneth (died 1611), English politician
Robert Stepneth (by 1513–1557), English politician